An Adventure in Hearts is a lost 1919 American silent adventure film directed by James Cruze and written by Elmer Blaney Harris based upon the 1918 novel Captain Dieppe by Anthony Hope and the resulting play by Hope and Harrison Garfield Rhodes. The film stars Robert Warwick, Juan de la Cruz, Winifred Greenwood, Helene Chadwick, Walter Long, and Howard Gaye. The film was released on December 7, 1919, by Paramount Pictures.

Cast
 Robert Warwick as Captain Dieppe
 Juan de la Cruz as Count Fieramondi
 Winifred Greenwood as Countess Fieramondi
 Helene Chadwick as Countess Lucia Bonavia D'Orano
 Walter Long as Guilamo Sevier
 Howard Gaye as Paul Sharpe

References

External links 
 
 

1919 films
1910s English-language films
American adventure films
1919 adventure films
Paramount Pictures films
Films based on works by Anthony Hope
Films directed by James Cruze
American black-and-white films
Lost American films
American silent feature films
Films set in Italy
1919 lost films
Lost adventure films
Silent adventure films
1910s American films